Krishnaraja may refer to:

 Krishnaraja (Vidhana Sabha constituency), a constituency in Karnataka, India
 Krishnaraja (Kalachuri dynasty), a 6th-century king of India
 Krishnaraja Wadiyar II, ruler of Mysore Kingdom of India
 Krishnaraja Wadiyar III, ruler of Mysore Kingdom of India
 Krishna Raja Wadiyar IV, ruler of Mysore Kingdom of India